Roch (lived c. 1348 – 15/16 August 1376/79 (traditionally c. 1295 – 16 August 1327, also called Rock in English, is a Catholic saint, a confessor whose death is commemorated on 16 August and 9 September in Italy; he is especially invoked against the plague. He has the designation of Rollox in Glasgow, Scotland, said to be a corruption of Roch's Loch, which referred to a small loch once near a chapel dedicated to Roch in 1506.

He is a patron saint of dogs, invalids, falsely accused people, bachelors, and several other things. He is the patron saint of Dolo (near Venice) and Parma, as well as Casamassima, Cisterna di Latina and Palagiano (Italy). He is also the patron saint of the town of Albanchez, in Almeria, southern Spain.

Saint Roch is known as "São Roque" in Portuguese, as "Sant Roc" in Catalan, as "San Roque" in Spanish (including in former colonies of the Spanish colonial empire such as the Philippines) and as "San Rocco" in Italian.

Etymology
Roch is given different names in various languages:
 
 
 
 
 
 
 
 
 Filipino: Roque/Duque
 
 German: Rochus
 
 
 
 
 
 
 
 Malayalam: റോക്കി (Rockey)
 
 
 
 
 
 
 Sinhala: 
 Tamil: Arockiya Nathar (புனித ஆரோக்கிய நாதர்)

Traditional biography 

The chronology of the Saint's life is uncertain and full of legendary elements. According to his Acta and his vita in the Golden Legend, he was born at Montpellier, at that time "upon the border of France," as the Golden Legend has it, the son of the noble governor of that city. His birth was accounted a miracle, for his noble mother had been barren until she prayed to the Virgin Mary. Miraculously marked from birth with a red cross on his breast that grew as he did, he early began to manifest strict asceticism and great devoutness; on days when his "devout mother fasted twice in the week, and the blessed child Rocke abstained him twice also when his mother fasted in the week and would suck his mother but once that day."

On the death of his parents in his twentieth year he distributed all his worldly goods among the poor, entered the Franciscan Third Order, and set out as a mendicant pilgrim for Rome, although his father on his deathbed had designated him governor of Montpellier.

Coming into Italy during an epidemic of plague, he was very diligent in tending the sick in the public hospitals at Acquapendente, Cesena, Rimini, Novara, and Rome, and is said to have effected many miraculous cures by prayer and the sign of the cross and the touch of his hand. At Rome, according to the Golden Legend, he preserved the "cardinal of Angleria in Lombardy" by making the mark of the cross on his forehead, which miraculously remained. Ministering at Piacenza at the hospital of Nostra Signora di Betlemme, he himself finally fell ill. He withdrew into the forest, where he made himself a hut of boughs and leaves, which was miraculously supplied with water by a spring that arose in the place; he would have perished had not a dog belonging to a nobleman named Gothard Palastrelli supplied him with bread and licked his wounds, healing them. Count Gottardo Pallastrelli, following his hunting dog that carried the bread, discovered Roch and brought him home to recover.

On his way back to return incognito to Montpellier, he was arrested at Voghera as a spy (by orders of his own uncle) and thrown into prison, where he languished five years and died on 16 August 1327, without revealing his name.
After his death, according to the Golden Legend;

The townspeople recognized him as well by his birthmark; he was soon canonized in the popular mind, and a great church erected in veneration.

The date (1327) asserted by Francesco Diedo for Roch's death would precede the traumatic advent of the Black Death in Europe (1347–49) after long centuries of absence, for which a rich iconography of the plague, its victims and its protective saints was soon developed, in which the iconography of Roche finds its historical place: previously the topos did not exist. In contrast, however, St. Roch of Montpellier cannot be dismissed based on the dates of a specific plague event. In medieval times, the term "plague" was used to indicate a whole array of illnesses and epidemics.

The first literary account is an undated Acta that is labelled, by comparison with the longer, elaborated accounts that were to follow, Acta Breviora, which relies almost entirely on standardized hagiographic topoi to celebrate and promote the cult of Roch.

The story that when the Council of Constance was threatened with plague in 1414, public processions and prayers for the intercession of Roch were ordered, and the outbreak ceased, is provided by Francesco Diedo, the Venetian governor of Brescia, in his Vita Sancti Rochi, 1478. The cult of Roch gained momentum during the bubonic plague that passed through northern Italy in 1477–79.

Veneration

His popularity, originally in central and northern Italy and at Montpellier, spread through Spain, France, Lebanon, the Low Countries, Brazil and Germany, where he was often interpolated into the roster of the Fourteen Holy Helpers, whose veneration spread in the wake of the Black Death. The 16th-century Scuola Grande di San Rocco and the adjacent church of San Rocco were dedicated to him by a confraternity at Venice, where his body was said to have been surreptitiously translated and was triumphantly inaugurated in 1485; the Scuola Grande is famous for its sequence of paintings by Tintoretto, who painted Roch in glory in a ceiling canvas (1564).

It is known for certain that the body of Roch was carried from Voghera, instead of Montpellier as previously thought, to Venice in 1485. Pope Alexander VI (1492–1503) built a church and a hospital in his honour. Pope Paul III (1534–1549) instituted a confraternity of St. Roch. This was raised to an archconfraternity in 1556 by Pope Paul IV; it still thrives today. Roch had not been officially recognized as yet as a saint, however. In 1590 the Venetian ambassador at Rome reported back to the Serenissima that he had been repeatedly urged to present the witnesses and documentation of the life and miracles of San Rocco, already deeply entrenched in the Venetian life, because Pope Sixtus V "is strong in his opinion either to canonize him or else to remove him from the ranks of the saints;" the ambassador had warned a cardinal of the general scandal that would result if the widely venerated San Rocco were impugned as an impostor. Sixtus did not pursue the matter but left it to later popes to proceed with the canonization process. His successor, Pope Gregory XIV (1590–1591), added Roch of Montpellier, who had already been memorialized in the Holy Sacrifice of the Mass for two centuries, to the Roman Catholic Church Martyrology, thereby fixing August 16 as his universal feast day.

Numerous brotherhoods have been instituted in his honor. He is usually represented in the garb of a pilgrim, often lifting his tunic to demonstrate the plague sore, or bubo, in his thigh, and accompanied by a dog carrying a loaf in its mouth. The Third Order of Saint Francis, by tradition, claims him as a member and includes his feast on its own calendar of saints, observing it on August 17.

Eponymous churches are numerous (cf. ) include the Church of St. Roch in Petrovaradin in Serbia.

In India there is a Church in Kerala in the name of Saint Roch under the Thrissur Archdiocese called St. Rocky's Church Pootharakkal. There is a huge statue of the saint about 24 feet in height (the first and only one in Asia). There is a special holy mass and Novena every Thursday.

Roch received renewed attention and veneration during the COVID-19 pandemic.

Saint Roch in art

Following the Black Death, especially the Italian plague epidemic of 1477–79, new images of Christian martyrs and saints appeared and Roch gained new fame and popularity. The religious art of the time emphasized the importance of the saint to plague-ridden Christians.

The new plague-related images of Roch were drawn from a variety of sources. Plague texts dating from ancient and classical times, as well as Christian, scientific and folk beliefs, all contributed to this emerging visual tradition.  Some of the most popular symbols of plague were swords, darts, and most especially arrows.  There was also a prevalence of memento mori themes, dark clouds, and astrological signs (signa magna) such as comets, which were often referenced by physicians and writers of plague tracts as causes of plague. The physical symptoms of plague – a raised arm, a tilted head, or a collapsed body – began to symbolize plague in post-Black Death paintings.

Plague saints offered hope and healing before, during, and after times of plague.  A specific style of painting, the plague votive, was considered a talisman for warding off plague. It portrayed a particular saint as an intercessor between God and the person or persons who commissioned the painting – usually a town, government, lay confraternity, or religious order to atone for the "collective guilt" of the community.

Rather than a society depressed and resigned to repeated epidemics, these votives represent people taking positive steps to regain control over their environment. Paintings of Roch represent the confidence in which renaissance worshipers sought to access supernatural aid in overcoming the ravages of plague.

The very abundance of means by which people invoked the aid of the celestial court is essential in understanding Renaissance responses to the disease. Rather than depression or resignation, people "possessed a confidence that put even an apocalyptic disaster of the magnitude of the Black Death into perspective of God's secure and benevolent plan for humankind."

The plague votives functioned both to request intercessory aid from plague saints and to provide catharsis for a population that had just witnessed the profound bodily destruction of the plague. Showing plague saints such as Roch and Sebastian invoked the memory of the human suffering experienced by Christ during the Passion. In the art of Roch after 1477, the saint displayed the wounds of his martyrdom without evidence of pain or suffering. Roch actively lifted his clothing to display the plague bubo on his thigh. This display of his plague bubo showed that "he welcomed his disease as a divinely sent opportunity to imitate the sufferings of Christ… [his] patient endurance [of the physical suffering of plague was] a form of martyrdom."

Roch's status as a pilgrim who suffered the plague is paramount in his iconography. "The sight of Roch scarred by the plague yet alive and healthy must have been an emotionally-charged image of a promised cure. Here was literal proof that one could survive the plague, a saint who had triumphed over the disease in his own flesh."

Saint Roch in literature

F. T. Prince published a long monologue from the perspective of Saint Roch's dog entitled 'His Dog and Pilgrim' in his 1983 collection Later On.

The breaking of a statue of Saint Roch is a crucial incident in the novel Clochemerle.

In Albert Camus’ novel The Plague, worshippers in the cathedral of Oran are seen gathered around the statue of Saint Roch.

In Doomsday Book by Connie Willis, a medieval priest who tends to plague victims is named Father Roche.

Saint Roch's dog is sometimes conflated with the folk saint Saint Guinefort, the holy greyhound.

Saint Roch in other media 
A 2012 Philippine fantasy teleserye, Aso ni San Roque (literally Saint Roch's Dog), depicts a dog from the statue of San Roque coming to life to serve as a guardian of a protagonist blind girl.

See also 
 San Rocco, Roman Catholic church in Piacenza, Italy

Notes

Citations

General references
 
 Acta sanctorum, August, iii.
 Charles Cahier, Les Characteristiques des saints, Paris, 1867

External links

 
 Medieval Sourcebook: The Golden Legend, book V: Saint Rocke, William Caxton, translator
 Patron Saints: Saint Roch
 "St. Roch, Confessor", Butler's Lives of the Saints

1295 births
1376 deaths
13th-century Christian saints
14th-century Christian saints
Franciscan saints
French Roman Catholic saints
Italian Roman Catholic saints
Medieval French saints
Clergy from Montpellier
Members of the Third Order of Saint Francis
Dogs in religion
Animals in Christianity
Impact of the COVID-19 pandemic on religion